The 132nd Massachusetts General Court, consisting of the Massachusetts Senate and the Massachusetts House of Representatives, met in 1911 during the governorship of Eugene Foss. Allen T. Treadway served as president of the Senate and Joseph Walker served as speaker of the House.

Senators

Representatives

See also
 1911 Massachusetts gubernatorial election
 62nd United States Congress
 List of Massachusetts General Courts

References

Further reading

External links

 
 

Political history of Massachusetts
Massachusetts legislative sessions
massachusetts
1911 in Massachusetts